Metrocenter is an under-construction elevated light rail station on the Valley Metro system in Phoenix. It is the northern terminus of the Northwest Extension Phase II, located on the east side of the former Metrocenter mall. The station includes a park and ride facility and relocated bus transit hub. It is the first elevated station in the system and is expected to open in 2024.

 the Metrocenter Transit Center is served by Valley Metro Bus Routes 27, 35, 90, 106, and the I-17 Rapid.

References

Valley Metro Rail stations in Phoenix, Arizona
Railway stations scheduled to open in 2024
Railway stations under construction in the United States
Future Valley Metro Rail stations
Bus stations in Arizona